Cancerwort is a common name for several plants and may refer to:

Kickxia
Linaria vulgaris, native to Europe, Siberia, and Central Asia